Psycho Tropical Berlin is the debut studio album by French band La Femme. It was released on April 8, 2013 under Barclay Records.

Track listing

Notes
 "Oh Baby Doll" is a cover of the 1957 song by Chuck Berry.

In popular culture
The track "Sur la planche" was used in a commercial for the Renault Captur.

The track "Sur la planche" was used in a french series Les Revenants, S01E03.

The track "Hypsoline" is featured as the ending credit song in the horror movie As Above, So Below.

The track "Si Un Jour" was used during the end credits for the Netflix series Lovesick.

The track "La Femme Ressort" was used during the short film "Crème Caramel"

The track "La Femme" was featured as the soundtrack of the Saint Laurent Paris Fall/Winter 2015/2016 Fashion show.

The track “It`s Time to Wake Up 2023” was used in the movie “Archive” from 2020

The track "La Femme Ressort" was used in Thai fantasy/mystery TV series Girl from Nowhere.

Critical reception 

Psycho Tropical Berlin was met with generally positive reviews from critics. Writing for NME, Huw Nesbitt praised the album's versatility: "[Psycho Tropical Berlin] brings together influences of ’50s Americana, ’60s French pop and ’80s synthpop and coldwave quite marvellously." However, Newbitt also criticized the album for dwelling on these influences: "[The album's] constant rehashing of the past creates a dull Groundhog Day effect." In her review of the album for Drowned in Sound, Kat Waplington noted the albums fusions of surf pop and cold wave with "a general Halloween vibe." Walpington concluded by emphasizing the album's potential to appeal to non-French speakers: "Whether or not you can be bothered to translate the lyrics, their manic, rollercoaster pop and fierce hooks should be enough of a draw for the most Anglophone listener."

References

2013 debut albums
Barclay (record label) albums
La Femme albums